Maddie Corman (born Madeleine Cornman; August 15, 1970) is an American actress. She has appeared in over 25 films, including Seven Minutes in Heaven, Some Kind of Wonderful, The Adventures of Ford Fairlane and A Beautiful Day in the Neighborhood.

Life and career 
Corman was born Madeleine Cornman in Manhattan, New York. She began her career as a child actress in the 1980s, at the age of 14. Corman's first television appearance was in the 1985 ABC Afterschool Special episode "I Want to Go Home", where she co-starred with John Getz, Seth Green and Marge Redmond.

That same year, she was cast in the Linda Feferman-directed teen comedy-drama motion picture Seven Minutes in Heaven. Corman starred opposite actress Jennifer Connelly as Polly Franklin, Connelly's character's intervening and overzealous best friend who is in love with a Major League Baseball player named Zoo Knudsen (Billy Wirth).

In 1987, Corman appeared in the John Hughes penned film Some Kind of Wonderful as Laura, the little sister of Keith Nelson, played by Eric Stoltz.

Her follow-up film was the 1990 Renny Harlin-directed comedy The Adventures of Ford Fairlane opposite Andrew "Dice" Clay, Priscilla Presley, Wayne Newton, Lauren Holly and Gilbert Gottfried.

Throughout the 1990s and 2000s, Corman frequently appeared on numerous popular American television series. She made several appearances as various characters on the television drama Law & Order and the HBO comedy Tracey Takes On... opposite comedian Tracey Ullman. She had a recurring role as Ruthie on the ABC comedy series All-American Girl (1994–1995) starring Margaret Cho. She also appeared in small roles in such films as Swingers (1996), Mickey Blue Eyes (1999), and Maid in Manhattan (2002).

In 2019, she starred in the Off-Broadway play Accidentally Brave, an autobiographical play about her husband Jace Alexander being charged with and convicted of possessing and sharing child pornography.

Personal life 
Corman was married to Roger M. Dickes from 1992 to 1997.

Corman married director Jace Alexander on September 6, 1998, in Carmel, New York. They have three children. The couple formerly lived in Dobbs Ferry, New York, but moved shortly after Alexander pleaded guilty to possessing and sharing child pornography.

Filmography

Film

Television

References

External links 

Official website
 
 
 

1970 births
20th-century American actresses
21st-century American actresses
Actresses from New York City
American child actresses
American film actresses
American stage actresses
American television actresses
Living people
People from Manhattan
People from Dobbs Ferry, New York